The Latvia Rugby League is the governing body for the sport of rugby league football in Latvia. The Association was formed in 2009.

See also

 Rugby league in Latvia
 Latvia national rugby league team

References

External links

Rugby league governing bodies in Europe
Rugby league in Latvia
Rugby League
Sports organizations established in 2009